Windy Run Grade School, also known as Windy Run School, is a historic one-room school located near Tesla, Braxton County, West Virginia. It was built in 1889, and is a one-story wood-frame structure measuring 24 feet wide and 28 feet deep. Also on the property is a small, gable roofed privy.  It ceased use as a school in 1963.

It was listed on the National Register of Historic Places in 1983.

References

Defunct schools in West Virginia
Educational institutions disestablished in 1963
Former school buildings in the United States
National Register of Historic Places in Braxton County, West Virginia
One-room schoolhouses in West Virginia
School buildings completed in 1889
Schools in Braxton County, West Virginia
School buildings on the National Register of Historic Places in West Virginia